Continuum is a Canadian science fiction television series created by Simon Barry that premiered on Showcase on May 27, 2012, and ran for four seasons. It was produced by Reunion Pictures, Boy Meets Girl Film Company, and Shaw Media.
The plot centres around the conflict between a group of terrorists from the year 2077 who time travel to Vancouver, British Columbia, in 2012 and a police officer who unintentionally accompanies them. In spite of being many years early, the terrorist group decides to continue its violent campaign to stop corporations of the future from replacing governments, while the police officer endeavours to stop them without revealing to everyone that she and the terrorists are from the future.

Premise 
City Protective Services (CPS) law enforcement officer Kiera Cameron lives with her husband and son in 2077-era Vancouver under the corporatocratic and oligarchic dystopia of the North American Union and its Corporate Congress, a technologically advanced high-surveillance police state. When a group of self-proclaimed freedom fighters known as Liber8 escape execution by fleeing to the year 2012, Kiera is involuntarily transported with them. Joining with Detective Carlos Fonnegra of the Vancouver Police Department and enlisting the help of teen computer genius—and future corporate oligarch—Alec Sadler, Kiera works to track down and thwart Edouard Kagame and his followers in the present day while concealing her identity as a time-traveler from the future and tries to find a way to return home to her family.

Prelude 
Episodes from the first and second seasons begin with the plot of the show narrated via a voice-over from the point of view of Kiera Cameron.

Starting with the third season, the narration was replaced by a new sequence that contains a computer-animated version of the time travel device, scenes from previous seasons, and cast credits before ending with Kiera Cameron (portrayed by Rachel Nichols) holding the device, followed by the title card.

Cast and characters

Main

 Rachel Nichols as City Protective Services (CPS) "Protector" Kiera Cameron, a law enforcement agent from 2077-era Vancouver who was sent back into the past with the members of Liber8 during their escape attempt at their execution. Cut off from her time period, she joins the Vancouver Police Department to pursue Liber8 and thwart their plans to alter the time line using her new position in the police department and the technology that she brought with her. At the beginning of Season Three, Kiera travels back in time from a week in the future when Alec attempts to change history, but the changes to history result in the death of her past self—referred to in this article as "Green Kiera"—while the version of her from the original time line, "Red Kiera", remains. In the series finale, Red Kiera finally returns to a different 2077 from the one she was originally sent from and sees yet another version of herself and "her son" (though only from afar). Although she can never be with her son, she realises through motivation from Alec that she can at least love and experience him growing up in this new future from a distance.
 Victor Webster as Vancouver Police Department (VPD) Detective Carlos Fonnegra, Kiera's partner with the present-day police; she tells him the truth about her time-traveler status in the second-season episode "Second Truths" in order to stop a historically proficient serial killer. Throughout the course of the second season, Fonnegra becomes disillusioned with the VPD's changing police procedures and is seen shaking hands with and joining Julian (Theseus) at the conclusion of the episode "Second Time" with colleague Betty Robertson; however, the time-line where he defected was erased due to Alec and Kiera's time-travel allowing them to undo the events that led to him losing faith in the system. He had some trouble dealing with the discovery of two Kieras when he learned about the time-travel, although he was still willing to conceal the body of Green Kiera even if he kept the body on ice to talk to her about his complex feelings. He was promoted to Inspector when Dillon moved on to work with Kellog after a suicidal attack by Sonya left him disfigured and crippled, working with Kiera to deal with the threat posed by the new time-travellers and Kellog's schemes. When Red Kiera finally is returned to 2077, she found that a park was commissioned and named in his memory.
 Erik Knudsen as the young Alec Sadler. As a teenager, before he went on to create SadTech, Alec is reclusive and prefers to spend time in his computer lab; there, he is able to communicate with Kiera through her cybernetic implants, which he discovers to be based on his own inventions. As of the third season, there are two Alecs in the time-line: "Green Alec", who was initially only aware of the one time-line, and "Red Alec", who traveled back in time from a week in the future to save his girlfriend's life, distinguished from his "Green" self due to a scar on his left temple from where he was shot while preparing to use the time machine. Green Alec was eventually killed in a fight with Red Alec (after attempting to strangle him) when he proved to be too dangerous, his actions creating a new alternate time-line. After Kiera returned to her time, Alec worked with his new friends and allies to create a better world for her, with Kiera being reunited with the elderly Alec of 2077 upon her return, Alec showing her the bright new world they have created.
 Stephen Lobo as Matthew Kellog, a former member of Liber8. Kellog deserts Liber8 in the first season and hopes to build a new and wealthy life for himself in the past using his knowledge of the future. His corporate machinations include tricking Alec out of his own company as he seeks to create his own legacy, but his arrogance and self-centeredness lead him to a point where he even plans to betray his future self when he receives a message from the future. In the series finale, he double-crosses Red Kiera and Alec in an attempt to return to 2012 so that he can kill Liber8 and Kiera when they first arrive in this time and influence Alec himself, but as they expect that, they feed him fake coordinates and he is sent back to pre-Columbian times, where there is no technology to assist his time travel efforts, and he dies of old age off-screen.
 Roger Cross as Travis Verta, a member of Liber8 and supersoldier, Kagame's right-hand man, and lover of Sonya Valentine. After Kagame's death, he was opposed to Valentine, Kagame's designated successor, seeking more violent methods and recruiting criminals into his version of Liber8. The two eventually reconciled. He is killed in a fight with Kiera in "Second Time", but his death is undone after the time-line is later altered. In the penultimate episode, after Kellog makes him realise that unlike the others in Liber8, he won't be remembered for something noble, but rather as a killer and as the source of bio-military technology derived from his body, he dies sacrificing himself to save Carlos and the remaining police officers in the VPD precinct from an explosion caused by the 2039 time traveler's replacement leader, taking said leader with him. 
 Lexa Doig as Sonya Valentine, a member of Liber8 and Travis Verta's lover, who is designated by Kagame as his official successor and leader after his death and now seeking to reform the world through ideas rather than violence and recruiting middle- and working-class people into her version of Liber8. She commits suicide in "The Dying Minutes" as the final execution of her plan to kill Dillon. (regular-season 1–3)
 Tony Amendola as Edouard Kagame, the leader and spokesman of Liber8; he sacrifices himself in the first-season finale as part of a larger plan, with Liber8 donating funds to support his mother, who gives birth to him on the day his future self dies. In the new time-line, he works with Alec and Julian to build a new world, and he is shown as a more comfortable, casual man than his more ruthless "original" self. In the series finale, Kiera discovers that Kagame worked with Alec to build a new world. (regular-season 1, recurring afterward)
 Omari Newton as Lucas Ingram, a member of Liber8 and former SadTech engineer who was forced to defect to Liber8's cause. He is not a soldier, but his technical skills remain crucial to his colleagues in Liber8. He sided with Sonya during the Liber8 civil war. His mental status becomes questionable, and he was briefly committed to a psychiatric ward, although he later escaped after his mental state stabilised. In "Power Hour", after killing the original leader of the 2039 time travelers named Marcellus to save Red Kiera and Garza, he is killed by Brad. 
 Luvia Petersen as Jasmine Garza, a soldier and member of Liber8. Garza is physically strong, agile, and lethal; but she has been damaged mentally by corporate imprisonment. She sided with Travis during Liber8's civil war and claimed to become Travis' current lover. Garza also has a connection with elderly Alec: apparently she intended to serve as his "insurance policy" if his younger self seems to deviate from his plans, although as with everyone else, she doesn't know whether the purpose is to change Alec's path, or to ensure it. She is killed when she and Kiera try to escape the time-travelers' base, but is released by Kiera when she travels back to counter Alec's changes. In the series finale, Curtis asks her why she is still fighting when Liber8 has already won and then asks if it's because she believes Red Kiera is the hope for a better future, much like why he fights, to which she implies that she agrees before leaving. She and Curtis are the only members of Liber8 to remain alive as adults in 2015 at the end of the series.
 Jennifer Spence as Betty Robertson, a colleague of Detective Fonnegra, who generally handles the computer side of their cases; she begins to sympathise with Liber8's motives to the point of providing them with information, for which she is arrested and placed in ankle monitor surveillance. In "So Do Our Minutes Hasten", she is killed by a mercenary named Neelon working for Sonmanto when she gets close to discovering their illegal operations, along with a hacker whom he used as a ruse. (regular-season 1–3)
 Brian Markinson as Vancouver Police Department Inspector Jack Dillon, Carlos and Betty's superior officer; he respects Kiera's insights despite the mysteries of her past. The red tape and politics of police work, which see him leave VPD to join Piron's board of directors, disillusion him and set him down a dark path that alienates Carlos and Betty and even surprises Kiera. He is critically injured in an attempted murder-suicide by Sonya in "The Dying Minutes". In the series finale, Dillon is killed by Kellog. Before his death, Cameron tells him who she and the other time travelers really are and the need to avoid the future they left; he joins in on the effort to stop Kellog from entering the portal to the future and dies in the process. (main seasons 1–3; recurring season 4)
 Ryan Robbins as Brad Tonkin, a time traveler from an alternate time-line in 2039 in which the Corporate Congress does not exist. He fires the fatal shot that kills Green Kiera with the help of Curtis Chen, after which he is hit by a van and wakes up in the hospital only remembering the name "Kiera Cameron". He recovers his memories thanks to a pharmaceutical treatment for Alzheimer's based on the future neuronarcotic "Flash". He is later captured with Kiera by Liber8 and reveals the (potentially worse) future that Liber8 has created. Red Kiera eventually forgives him for her counterpart's murder, and he assists them in thwarting the attempted invasion from his future. In the series finale, he decides to build with the others the future that Kiera envisioned. (Recurring Season 3, Regular Season 4)

Recurring
 Richard Harmon as Julian Randol, Alec's stepbrother in 2012. Later in his life, he will be known as Theseus, the founder of Liber8 and mentor to Edouard Kagame. When Kiera has a gun pointed at him in "Second Guessed", her comments about his future/her past echos what Liber8 had previously said to him, making him wonder about their origin and consider choosing his path, reflected in his choosing ideas over violence in the next episode. He is hired by Alec in "Revolutions per Minute" to act as an adviser for public affairs. In the series finale, he chooses to build with the others the future Kiera envisions.
 Gerry Nairn portrays the elderly Theseus in 2077.
 Terry Chen as Curtis Chen, a follower of the traveller and former member of Liber8. In the episode "Second Wave" it is revealed that Chen is a member of the Freelancer cell from 2077. He is killed by Kiera's handgun's safeguard system but is later revived by the Freelancers from the 2012 cell in the episode "The Dying Minutes". As Curtis is being introduced to the cell from the 2012 time-line, he immediately points out that his revival is a violation. After he finds out the Traveller is being held prisoner by the cell from this time-line, he kills Catherine and frees the Traveller. He was originally believed to be the shooter who killed Green Kiera in the episode "Minute by Minute" and was then imprisoned by the Freelancers in "Waning Minute" but later escapes in the same episode. In "3 Minutes to Midnight", it is revealed that he was not responsible for Green Kiera's death but was working alongside someone who was: Brad. In the series finale, he helps the Traveller to return to his time and stays in 2015 with Garza to build, with the others, the future as Kiera dreamed.
 Magda Apanowicz as Emily/Maya Hartwell, Alec's girlfriend. It is revealed in the second-season episode "Second Degree" that she is working for Escher. She is killed by the Freelancers in pursuit of the time travel device in "Second Last". In the episode "Second Time", Alec travels back to one week prior to her death and successfully prevents it. In the modified time-line first revealed in "Minute by Minute", she murders Escher and then finds herself caught in the paradoxical situation of two Alec Sadlers being in existence. She chooses the Red Alec who travelled in time to save her.
 Ian Tracey as Jason Sadler, an alleged former employee of the same prison where Liber8 escaped from, thrown back in time to 1992 rather than 2012. His sanity is not quite intact from his prolonged time alone; he has hinted that he has learned that there are other time travellers, capable of going back and forth through time that are present in their current era, known as Freelancers, but considering his mental state this information is regarded with questionable accuracy. In the third episode of the second season, "Second Thoughts", it is hinted that he is Marc Sadler (Alec's father). It is revealed in "Second Time" that he is Alec's son in 2077 instead and that he played a major role in sending Liber8 back in time. Starting in "Revolutions per Minute", he becomes a beta tester for Alec's Halo project and he recovers lucidity, but his mental health begins to deteriorate and in "3 Minutes to Midnight", he is responsible for attacking a random jogger and later he attempts to kill Julian because of what he knows he will become.
 William B. Davis as the elderly Alec Sadler in 2077. In the future, Alec founded SadTech in the later twenty-first century. He has risen to head one of the largest and most powerful corporations in the world, as its owner and CEO, his influence and technology dominate the North American Union. He was also a founding father of the Global Corporate Congress, and is currently Chairman of Superior Council. Alec is responsible for the presence of both Kiera and Liber8 in 2012; in season 2, it is suggested that he regrets having founded the corporate future world, due to all that has been lost to create it, and has set a plan in motion, with Kiera at the centre, to change it—or perhaps ensure it. After a brief meeting between his past self and his "original" self, Kiera meets the elderly Alec of the new time-line she created when she returns to 2077, this Alec assuring her that her friends built a better world in her memory, albeit at the cost of this world having its own version of Kiera that will prevent her from ever being with her son again. 
 Nicholas Lea as Canadian Security Intelligence Service (CSIS) Agent Gardiner. He believes that Kiera is feeding information to Liber8 due to her anomalous background, although Kiera and Carlos mistakenly speculate that he may be the mole himself. In "Second Degree", he and Kiera find a middle road when she asks him to help investigate about the Freelancers. In next episode, he is killed by Warren, one of the Freelancers for his investigation.
 Hugh Dillon as Mr Escher/Marc Sadler, ex-freelancer, CEO, and chairman of Piron, Alec's father, and a shadowy figure with powerful connections, who appears to know something about Liber8 and Kiera's true origin. He has protected Kiera and seeks to form an alliance with her, however his true motives are as yet unclear. In "Second Time", he reveals himself to be Alec's father. In the modified time-line first revealed in "Minute by Minute", he is murdered by Emily.
 Mike Dopud as Stefan Jaworski, a member of Liber8. He is the first of the Liber8 members to die in 2012 during a confrontation with Kiera and Carlos in "A Stitch in Time".
 Tahmoh Penikett as Jim Martin, politician and Carlos' friend. He is secretly working with Liber8 in his quest to become Mayor of Vancouver. In the modified time-line, He commits suicide in "Minute Men".
 John Reardon as Greg Cameron, Kiera's husband. He is a SadTech project leader, and Alec Sadler is his boss. He is primarily seen in Kiera's flashbacks to her life in 2077.
 Sean Michael Kyer as Sam Cameron, Kiera's young son. Kiera's abrupt separation from him causes her a degree of psychological anxiety. He is primarily seen in Kiera's flashbacks to her life in 2077, and he serves as her primary motivation for wanting to return home.
 Michael Rogers as Roland Randol, Julian's father and Alec's stepfather. Like his son, he is firmly against corporate leadership but does not advocate violence to achieve Liber8's goals. He is killed in "Family Time" by a police sniper during an Emergency Response Team (ERT) operation, when said sniper mistakes Roland for a hostile and shoots him.
 Janet Kidder as Ann Sadler, Alec's mother and Julian's stepmother.
 Adrian Holmes as Warren, one of the Freelancers. He was sent back in time along with Jason from 2077. He is killed by Brad in "The Dying Minutes".
 Zak Santiago as Miller, one of the Freelancers. He is presumed dead in "The Dying Minutes" as he is never seen again.
 Rachael Crawford as Catherine, the leader of the Freelancers. She is killed by Curtis in "The Dying Minutes".
 Caitlin Cromwell as Elena, Kiera's "Protector" partner in 2077. She is revealed to have travelled back in time to the year 1975. She and Kiera briefly reunite in "Second Skin", only to see Elena die shortly after from Alzheimer's disease, leaving Kiera deeply distraught.

Episodes 

The first season has 10 episodes. On August 25, 2012, Showcase renewed Continuum for a second season of 13 episodes, which premiered on April 21, 2013, on Showcase in Canada, May 23, 2013, on Syfy in the UK, and June 7, 2013, on Syfy in the US. On June 5, 2013, Continuum was officially renewed for a third season, which premiered on March 16, 2014, on Showcase in Canada and April 4, 2014, on Syfy in the US.

During an interview in May 2014, Simon Barry revealed that he had 7 to 10 seasons in mind for Continuum. Showcase announced on December 8, 2014, that Continuum had been renewed for a fourth and final season of six episodes, which began airing on September 4, 2015, on Showcase in Canada, and September 11, 2015, on Syfy in the US. The series concluded, with a complete and final outcome to the storyline, on October 9, 2015.

Production

Development 
Series creator Simon Barry explains how the show was picked up by Showcase:

Broadcast
The series premiered in Canada on May 27, 2012, with Season 1 consisting of ten episodes; and concluded on October 9, 2015, after forty-two episodes.

In French Canada, it debuted on addikTV on November 6, 2013.

It premiered in the UK on September 27, 2012, on Syfy (UK), with season 2 returning on May 23, 2013, and season 3 on January 28, 2015.

The series premiered in the U.S. on January 14, 2013, on Syfy, with season 2 premiering on June 7, 2013, season 3 on April 4, 2014 and season 4 on September 11, 2015.

The series premiered in Australia on SF on February 21, 2013, and returned for season 2 on October 3, 2013. Season 3 premiered on Syfy (Australia) (the replacement to the now defunct SF) on May 5, 2014.

Cancellation
The show was cancelled mid-story, but was allowed to make a further six episodes in a fourth season to come to a conclusion. Because of the reduced number of episodes, the final season focused primarily on Kiera, Alec, Carlos and Kellog. Emily, Julian and the Traveler were originally all supposed to get larger stories, but their threads had to be dropped. The Traveler, who had a build-up in season three, was meant to be used as a way to branch out and expand the show's mythology by exploring his background in detail and how he was connected to everything. There were also talks about doing an entire season about the members of Liber8 and their individual backstories.

Simon Barry has also expressed interest in continuing the Continuum universe and mythology in other mediums if possible, as there were "some great ideas that never made it to the screen" due to the cancellation; for instance, he would love to follow Kellog's story after the final episode as a book or graphic novel. He also says he would love to see fans exploring the universe and characters in the form of fan fiction.

Reception

Critical response
The review aggregator website Rotten Tomatoes reports an 86% approval rating for the first season, with an average rating of 7.2/10 based on 14 reviews. The website's consensus reads, "Continuum blends time-tested genre ingredients to deliver a sci-fi crime drama that's solidly entertaining despite its overall familiarity." Reviewer Neil Genzlinger of The New York Times described the series as "slick" and highlighted its attention to detail. Reviewer David Hinckley of the New York Daily News compared Continuum positively to Life on Mars, another series with a time travelling police officer, and gave the show three stars out of five. According to Hinckley, the series has potential to do well, and if it "doesn't aim to soar, it executes the basics well".

Rotten Tomatoes gave an 80% approval rating for the second season, with an average rating of 6.1/10 based on 5 reviews, a 100% approval rating for the third season, with an average rating of 8.4/10 based on 7 reviews, and an 88% approval rating for the fourth season, with an average rating of 8.0/10 based on 8 reviews,

Awards 

On January 15, 2013, the day after the U.S. launch, the Canadian Screen Awards nominated Continuum for 5 Screenies: Best Drama Series, Writing, Direction, Music and Visual Effects. It won in the latter category. The show received a record 16 Leo Award nominations.

Other media
Zeros 2 Heroes Media Inc. has created an alternate reality game website, Continuum the Game.

The game site also includes a "Comics" section, featuring Continuum: The War Files, which is an eight-part graphic novel that tells of the war going on in 2065 between the Corporations and Liber8. The comic was available only in Canada.

Rittenhouse released a trading card set based on the show in June 2014.

Notes

References

External links 

 
 Continuum at SyFy
 

 
2010s Canadian drama television series
2010s Canadian time travel television series
2012 Canadian television series debuts
2015 Canadian television series endings
Fiction set in the 2070s
2010s Canadian science fiction television series
Television series set in the 2010s
English-language television shows
Overpopulation fiction
Saturn Award-winning television series
Showcase (Canadian TV channel) original programming
Television series by Corus Entertainment
Television shows filmed in Vancouver
Television shows set in Vancouver
Canadian time travel television series
Dystopian television series
Temporal war fiction